Pasiphila acompsa is a moth in the family Geometridae. It was described by Louis Beethoven Prout in 1927. It is endemic to New Zealand and has been observed in mountainous locations in both the North and South Islands. Larvae of this species have been reared on plants within the Veronica genus. Adults are on the wing from December to February.

Taxonomy
This species was first described by Alfred Philpott in 1915 and named Chloroclystis modesta. However the species name Chloroclystis acompsa was proposed by Louis Beethoven Prout as a replace name for the name given by Alfred Philpott which Prout regarded as being preoccupied by Chloroclystis modesta described by William Warren. In 1971 John S. Dugdale placed this species in the genus Pasiphila. In 1988 John S. Dugdale discussed this species under the name Pasiphila acompsa and in 2010 Robert Hoare in the New Zealand Inventory of Biodiversity followed this placement. The male holotype specimen was collected at Bold Peak in the Otago by Charles Cuthbert Fenwick and is now held at Te Papa.

Description 

Philpott's description of this species is as follows:

This species is similar in appearance to Pasiphila dryas but it lacks the pink-brown shade of the latter species.

Distribution
This species is endemic to New Zealand and has been observed on Mount Taranaki and Mount Ruapehu in the North Island and on Ben Lomond, Bold Peak and around Lake Wakatipu, all in Otago in the South Island. P. acompsa has been observed at altitudes of between 3,000 and 4,000 feet.

Behaviour
Adults of this species are on the wing from December to February.

Hosts 

Larvae of this species have been reared on plants within the Veronica genus.

References

Moths described in 1927
acompsa
Moths of New Zealand
Endemic fauna of New Zealand
Taxa named by Louis Beethoven Prout
Endemic moths of New Zealand